= Shasa =

Multinational fashion retailer

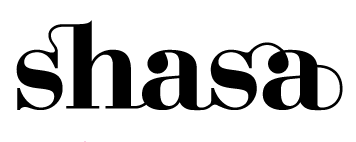
- Type: Private
- Industry: Retail, Fashion
- Founded: Los Angeles, California, 1995
- Headquarters: Los Angeles, California
- Number of locations: 113 (2024)
- Key people: Private family members
- Products: Clothing, Footwear, Accessories, Jewelry, Beauty
- Revenue: Private
- Total assets: Private
- Number of employees: 1,500 (2016)

Shasa is a multinational fashion retailer established in 1995. Shasa offers apparel, jewelry, accessories, beauty and footwear in the women's market.
